Julien Remiti (born 7 September 1994) is a French footballer who plays as a midfielder for Ligue 1 side AC Ajaccio.

Career
Remiti made his Ligue 1 debut with AC Ajaccio on 8 March 2014 against FC Nantes in a 2–2 away draw coming on as a substitute after 71 minutes.

References

External links

1994 births
Living people
Association football midfielders
French footballers
AC Ajaccio players
Ligue 1 players
Place of birth missing (living people)